The Koyna Hydroelectric Project is the largest hydroelectric power plant in India, just after Tehri Dam Project. It is a complex project with four dams including the largest dam on the Koyna River, Maharashtra hence the name Koyna Hydroelectric Project. The project site is in Satara district.

The Koyana Dam situated near Koyananagar village. On river Koyana.

The project consists of four stages of power generation. All the generators are located in underground powerhouses excavated deep inside the mountains of the Western Ghats. A dam foot powerhouse also contributes to the electricity generation. Due to the project's electricity generating potential the Koyna River is considered as the life line of Maharashtra.

The project takes advantage of the height of Western Ghats. Thus a very large hydraulic head is available over a very short distance.

History
In the early 20th century, there was a survey of the Koyna River as a potential hydro-electric source. After the First World War, a hydro-electric project on the Koyna river was investigated by the Tata Group. The 1928 financial crisis caused the project to be shelved. After the independence of India, it was taken over by the Government of Maharashtra. In 1951 Koyna Dam division started to look into the project. The project was approved in 1953 and work commenced in early 1954. The second stage of the project was made using a World Bank loan (Project loan number 24-IN.

Description

The project is composed of four dams with the major contributors being the Koyna Dam and Kolkewadi Dam. The water from Shivasagar reservoir was formed by the Koyna Dam  and is used in the 1st, 2nd and 4th stages. This water is drawn from head race tunnels situated below the reservoir. Then it travels through vertical pressure shafts to the underground powerhouses. The discharged water from these stages is collected and stored in Kolkewadi Dam situated near village of Alore. The water is drawn from the penstocks of Kolkewadi Dam to an underground power station in the 3rd stage and then discharged to the Arabian Sea.

The electricity generated in all the stages is delivered to the main electrical grid. The project is run by the Maharashtra State Electricity Board.

Besides this dam foot powerhouse part of power plant also produces 40 MW through two generating units of 20 MW each, totalling 1960 MW. Details of each stage are given below.

Stage I and II
The first stage of the project was approved in late 1953 and construction began in early 1954. Initially a two-stage construction was conceived. But the total generation capacity of the two stages was too large for load forecasts of that time. So a time lag of more than 10 years was proposed between the two stages. Within two years thereafter, it came to be noticed that the 10 years time tag between these two stages will not be affordable and to cope up with the power requirements, the two stages should be merged and both the stages should be constructed simultaneously. Hence, it was accepted that the two stages have to be executed as one.

The 1st and 2nd stages share same powerhouse with total eight Pelton turbine units. Each of the two stages has four turbines having capacity of 65 MW each for 1st stage and 75 MW each for 2nd stage. The water from Shivasagar reservoir is taken through an intake structure known as Navja tower near village of Navja into the head race tunnel. Then it travels towards the surge tank. It is further divided into four pressure shafts which run vertically downward delivering water to the turbines. Then the water is discharged into the tail race tunnel.

A dam foot powerhouse was also constructed which is used to generate electricity by the water which is discharged from the Koyna Dam for irrigation purpose. It has two Francis turbine units of 20 MW each. This powerhouse is run according to the irrigation requirements of the downstream areas.

The combined installed capacity of the two stages and the dam foot powerhouse is 600 MW.

Stage III
Initially a weir was proposed to divert the water coming out of tail race tunnel of Stage I and II.  But it was later observed that the water still had a hydraulic head of about 120 m which could be used.  To use this head, the Kolkewadi Dam was constructed at this location.  It forms a balancing reservoir and maintains the head.  This dam impounds the tail race water from Stage I and II.  This water is drawn through penstocks and electricity is generated by four Francis turbine units with a capacity of 80 MW each. The tail race water from these stages then flows through a channel and joins the Arabian Sea near Chiplun.

The installed generating capacity of this stage is 320 MW.

Stage IV
Later in the 1980s, the electricity demand of the Maharashtra increased tremendously resulting in inadequate power supply. The Planning Commission accorded approval to Stage IV with installation capacity of 4 × 250 MW. Thus, one more stage called Stage IV was added to power system of Stages I and II, thus converting the Koyna Power Station into a peaking power station complex with load factor of about 18.7%. This scheme also draws water from the existing Shivasagar reservoir same as Stages I and II.

A nonconventional intake system was created by piercing the lake from the bottom by blasting the rock plug using dynamite. This double lake tapping process was the first of its kind in Asia.

The water in head race tunnel is directly drawn from the reservoir and delivered to the head surge tank. Then four pressure shafts take the water downward vertically. The four huge Francis turbine units of 250 MW each generate electricity and tail race water is taken into the Kolkewadi Dam reservoir through tail race tunnel. A revolutionary gas insulated switchgear system is used in the underground powerhouse of this stage.

The installed capacity of this stage alone is 1000 Mw. This stage is mostly used to cater for the peak hour demands of the electric grid.

Features

This is the largest completed hydroelectric project in India.
The water used for generation of electricity joins the Arabian Sea near Chiplun while the water which discharges through the spillways of the dam in monsoon season joins the Bay of Bengal through the Krishna River.
The process of double lake tapping was the first of its kind in Asia.
All the components of the project such as powerhouses, head race and tail race tunnels, pressure shafts are constructed underground.
The modern gas insulated switchgear system is used in 4th stage of the project.

Future plans
To utilise more water from the Shivasagar reservoir, another dam foot powerhouse is being constructed on the left bank of the dam. This powerhouse will employ a pumped storage scheme. Also lake tapping is proposed for the intake system.

Tourism
The impounded water of the Koyna Dam though has submerged a significant amount of rain forest of the Western Ghats, it has helped a lot to the surrounding forest by supplying water all round the year. Hence a wide biodiversity of plants and animals is observed in the evergreen forest surrounding the reservoir area.

Koyna Wildlife Sanctuary

Koyna Wildlife Sanctuary has dense forests with three major sections, Vasota, Maharkhor and Indavli Met, and the sanctuary is endowed with natural protective boundaries – Shivasagar Lake on one side, and the slopes of the Western Ghats on both the sides. This protective cover has enabled the emergence of a diverse variety of flora and fauna in the sanctuary. Some of the endangered species of trees  found in the sanctuary are Dhup (Boswellia serrata), Euphorbia longan, and Elaeocarpus spp., apart from many other species of trees. The sanctuary has a diverse variety of fauna including tigers and panthers; gaurs and sambars; barking and mouse deer; pythons and cobras; common langurs and Indian giant squirrels. Many species of birds are found in the sanctuary including brown capped woodpecker; Asian fairy bluebird; and crested goshawk.

The legend states that the fort was constructed by Malwa king Raja Bhoja in 1170.

Nehru Memorial park 
When the project work was nearing completion, on 10 April 1960, the then Prime Minister of India Pt. Jawaharlal Nehru visited the Koyna Project. To commemorate this event a tableau was unveiled at his gracious hands on the right flank hillock of Koyna Dam.
This project came up with an idea of immortalizing this place and this event by constructing a beautiful park and naming it as "Nehru Memorial Park". This park is a major attraction for tourists. An upstream side view of dam is visible from this garden. There is an auditorium named 'Yashogatha' (meaning: story of success) which relives a small element of the tremendous efforts taken by the engineers and workers associated with project.

Ozarde falls 

Due to the large rainfall in the hilly region surrounding the reservoir, some beautiful falls are generated in the monsoon season. The largest of them is the Ozarda falls near Navaja village 10 km from Koyna. This is also a major attraction for tourists visiting in monsoon season.

See also 

 Koyna Dam
 Koyna Wildlife Sanctuary
 List of power stations in India
 List of conventional hydroelectric power stations

References

External links 

 

Hydroelectric power stations in Maharashtra
Underground power stations
Pumped-storage hydroelectric power stations in India
1962 establishments in Maharashtra
Energy infrastructure completed in 1962